The Saint Helena National Trust is an independent not-for-profit organization which aims to preserve Saint Helena's environmental and cultural heritage. It was founded on 22 May 2002, the 500th anniversary of Saint Helena's discovery. The Patron of the Trust was the Duke of York and has defaulted back to HRM The Queen.

The Trust was established under the [St Helena National Trust Ordinance, 2001]. Its principle objectives are to preserve, maintain, manage, protect and augment, tender advice, promote access to and enjoyment of land, buildings, animal life, plant life, marine life, furniture, pictures, and documents and chattels of any description having national or historic or artistic interest.

Projects
The Millennium Forest is a 250-hectare area of replanting on the island, which aims to restore part of what was the Great Wood. The Trust continues to repopulate the Forest and uses it for community engagement, connecting the endemic species, and invertebrates in lesson planning and general awareness.

The Trust is committed to the conservation of the Saint Helena plover, the national bird of the island, which is locally known as the wirebird. The Darwin Plus 107 project assists the Trust with the reduction of invasive vertebrate species that serves as a threat to the wirebird population.

Within the last 4 years, the Trust has established a Marine Conservation Section, working in partnership with Blue Marine Foundation with a key focus being whale sharks aka "Bone Shark" (local name).

In 2006, Michel Dancoisne-Martineau donated the heart-shaped waterfall valley to the Trust. A new pathway was constructed through the valley, which opened in December 2010.

The Trust also want to preserve and promote the island's built heritage, especially that from the 17th and 18th centuries. The Trust have begun a project to restore High Knoll Fort near Jamestown.
 
The Trust is currently working on the digitalisation of the Archives, particularly focusing on the East India Company records of St Helena from 1673 and 1834.

References

External links
Saint Helena National Trust website

Organizations established in 2002
National Trust
Saint Helenian culture
History of Saint Helena
National trusts
2002 establishments in Saint Helena and Dependencies